Chronic lung disease may refer to:
 Asthma
 Bronchopulmonary dysplasia
 Chronic obstructive pulmonary disease, including chronic bronchitis and emphysema